| tries = {{#expr:
 + 6 + 6 + 6 + 2 + 0 + 2 + 2 + 5 + 3 + 7
 + 0 + 3 + 2 + 5 + 1 + 6 + 7 + 4 + 7 + 6
 + 5 + 7 + 3 + 8 + 5 + 5 + 2 + 6 + 6 + 6
 + 1 + 2 + 7 + 7 + 6 + 5 + 5 + 2 + 2 + 2
 + 3 + 5 + 3 + 2 + 4 + 7 + 3 + 8 + 4 + 1
 + 7 + 1 + 4 + 2 + 1 + 9 + 4 + 8 + 2 + 1
 + 5 + 0 + 2 + 5 + 1 + 2 + 2 + 3 + 6 + 3
 + 3 + 2 + 3 + 4 + 3 + 4 + 2 + 6 + 6 + 7
 + 2 + 3 + 5 +12 + 4 + 5 + 2 + 4 + 5 + 3
 + 4 + 4 + 4 + 4 + 5 + 2 + 4 + 2 + 3 + 4
 + 4 +12 + 5 + 8 + 5 + 7 + 1 + 7 + 5 + 7
}}
| top point scorer = Gavin Henson (Neath-Swansea Ospreys)(175 points)
| top try scorer = Kevin Morgan (Newport Gwent Dragons)(12 tries)
| website = pro14rugby.org
| prevseason = 2003–04
| nextseason = 2005–06
}}
The 2004–05 Celtic League was the fourth Celtic League season, and the second following the introduction of regional rugby in Wales.  It involved Irish, Scottish and Welsh rugby union clubs. The restructured Celtic League saw the Welsh regional side the Neath-Swansea Ospreys finish top of the table to take the title.

Teams

Table

Fixtures

Round 1

Round 2

Round 3

Round 4

Round 5

Round 6

Round 7

Round 8

Round 9

Round 10

Round 11

Round 12

Round 13

Round 14

Round 15

Round 16

Round 17

Round 18

Round 19

Round 20

Round 21

Round 22

Leading scorers
Note: Flags to the left of player names indicate national team as has been defined under IRB eligibility rules, or primary nationality for players who have not yet earned international senior caps. Players may hold one or more non-IRB nationalities.

Top points scorers

Top try scorers

Notes

External links
 MagnersLeague.com
 2004–05 Celtic League at BBC

References

 
2004-05
 
Celtic League
Celtic League
Celtic League